Pepsi Number Fever, also known as the 349 incident, was a promotion held by PepsiCo in the Philippines in 1992, which led to riots and the deaths of at least five people.

Promotion
In February 1992, Pepsi Philippines (PCPPI) announced that they would print numbers, ranging from 001 to 999, inside the caps (crowns) of Pepsi, 7-Up, Mountain Dew and Mirinda bottles. Certain numbers could be redeemed for prizes, which ranged from 100 pesos (about US$4) to 1 million pesos for a grand prize (roughly US$40,000 in 1992), equivalent to 611 times the average monthly salary in the Philippines at the time. Pepsi allocated a total of US$2 million for prizes. Marketing specialist Pedro Vergara based Pepsi Number Fever on similar, moderately successful promotions that had been held previously in Vergara's geographic area of expertise, Latin America.

Pepsi Number Fever was initially wildly successful, and increased Pepsi's monthly sales from $10 million to $14 million and its market share from 19.4% to 24.9%. Winning numbers were announced on television nightly. By May, 51,000 prizes had been redeemed, including 17 grand prizes, and the campaign was extended beyond the originally planned end date of May 8 by another 5 weeks.

Number 349
On May 25, 1992, The World Tonight announced that the grand prize number for that day was 349. Grand prize-winning bottle caps were tightly controlled by PepsiCo; two bottles with caps with that day's winning number printed inside of them, as well as a security code for confirmation, had been produced and distributed. However, before the contest was extended to add new winning numbers, 800,000 regular bottle caps had already been printed with the number 349 (but without the security code). Theoretically, these bottle caps were cumulatively worth $32 billion US.

Thousands of Filipinos rushed to Pepsi bottling plants to claim their prizes. PCPPI initially responded that the erroneously printed bottle caps did not have the confirmation security code, and therefore could not be redeemed. Newspapers the next morning announced that the winning number was in fact 134, adding to the confusion. After an emergency meeting of PCPPI and PepsiCo executives at 3:00a.m. on the 27th, the company offered 500 pesos ($18) to holders of mistakenly printed bottle caps, as a "gesture of good will". This offer would be accepted by 486,170 people, at a cost to PepsiCo of US$8.9 million (240 million pesos).

Many irate 349 bottle cap holders refused to accept PCPPI's settlement offer. They formed a consumer group, the 349 Alliance, which organized a boycott of Pepsi products, and held rallies outside the offices of PCPPI and the Philippine government. Most protests were peaceful, but on February 13, 1993; a schoolteacher and a 5-year-old child were killed in Manila by a homemade bomb thrown at a Pepsi truck and in May, three PCPPI employees in Davao were killed by a grenade thrown into a warehouse.  PCPPI executives received death threats, and as many as 37 company trucks were damaged by being pushed over, stoned or burned. One of the three men accused by the NBI of orchestrating the bombings claimed they had been paid by Pepsi to stage the attacks, in order to frame the protesters as terrorists; then-senator Gloria Macapagal Arroyo however suggested that the attacks were being perpetrated by rival bottlers attempting to take advantage of PCPPI's vulnerability.

Legal action
About 22,000 people took legal action against PepsiCo; at least 689 civil suits and 5,200 criminal complaints for fraud and deception were filed. In January 1993, Pepsi paid a fine of 150,000 pesos to the Department of Trade and Industry for violating the approved conditions of the promotion.  On June 24, 1996, a trial court awarded the plaintiffs in one of the lawsuits 10,000 pesos (about US$380) each in "moral damages". Three dissatisfied plaintiffs appealed, and on July 3, 2001, the appellate court awarded these three plaintiffs 30,000 pesos (about US$570) each, as well as attorneys' fees. PCPPI appealed against this decision. The suit would reach the Philippines Supreme Court, which in 2006 ruled that "PCPPI is not liable to pay the amounts printed on the crowns to their holders. Nor is PCPPI liable for damages thereon", and that "the issues surrounding the 349 incident have been laid to rest and must no longer be disturbed in this decision."

See also
Leonard v. Pepsico, Inc.
McDonald's Monopoly
Hoover free flights promotion

References

External links
 TV commercials for Pepsi Number Fever

1992 in the Philippines
PepsiCo advertising campaigns
Sales promotion
1992 controversies
Corporate scandals
Controversies in the Philippines
Consumer boycotts